Józef Marusarz (25 January 1926 – 3 April 1996) was a Polish alpine skier. He competed at the 1948, 1952 and the 1956 Winter Olympics.

References

1926 births
1996 deaths
Polish male alpine skiers
Olympic alpine skiers of Poland
Alpine skiers at the 1948 Winter Olympics
Alpine skiers at the 1952 Winter Olympics
Alpine skiers at the 1956 Winter Olympics
Sportspeople from Zakopane
20th-century Polish people